Christmas from the Heart is the second studio album and first Christmas album by American singer David Archuleta. It was released on October 13, 2009, via Jive Records. "Melodies of Christmas", which was written by Archuleta, is the lone original song on the album.

Track listing 
"Joy to the World" – 4:19
"Angels We Have Heard on High" – 3:36
"O Come All Ye Faithful" – 3:19
"Silent Night" – 4:49
"The First Noel" – 4:32
"O Holy Night" – 5:55
"Have Yourself a Merry Little Christmas" (featuring Charice Pempengco) – 4:36
"I'll Be Home for Christmas" – 3:01
"Pat-a-Pan" – 3:25
"What Child Is This?" – 4:47
"Riu Riu Chiu" – 3:54
"Ave Maria" – 5:44
"Melodies of Christmas" – 4:35

Promotion 

David Archuleta promoted the album on his Christmas from the Heart Tour. He performed several songs from the album in several shows, such as "Silent Night" at the Kaleidoscope Thanksgiving Special on November 26, 2009, "Melodies of Christmas" on Live with Regis and Kelly, "Pat-a-Pan" on Larry King Live, "Angels We Have Heard on High" on Fox & Friends and The Today Show, and "Ave Maria on Nuestra Navidad, a special on Univision, a Hispanic network.

Sales and chart performance

Sales 
 United States — 246,000

Chart performance

Singles charts

References 

David Archuleta albums
Jive Records albums
2009 Christmas albums
Christmas albums by American artists
Pop Christmas albums
19 Recordings albums